Catatan Si Boy is a 1987 Indonesian action film drama directed by Nasri Cheppy and starring Didi Petet. The film, a success, spawned five sequels, as well as remake in 2016. The film was inspired by a popular radio drama show of the same name broadcast by Prambors Rasisonia from June 1985 to the late 80s. As with the radio show, Catatan Si Boy chronicled the life of the main character "Boy", the son of a very rich Indonesian family who owns a conglomerate of companies in many industries.

Cast
Didi Petet as Emon
Onky Alexander as Boy 
Ayu Azhari as Nuke   
Meriam Bellina as  Vera 
Faradina   
Leroy Osmani   
Kaharudin Syah   
Nani Widjaja
Dede Yusuf as Andy

External links
 

1987 films
Indonesian drama films
1980s Indonesian-language films
1987 action films
Films shot in Indonesia
Indonesian action films
Films directed by Nasri Cheppy